Daniel Byron Verdin III  (born May 9, 1964) is a member of the South Carolina Senate, representing District 9 (Greenville and Laurens Counties). In November 2008, he was chosen as majority whip.

Early life and career
Verdin is the son of Dr. Daniel B. and Eloise Watts Verdin. He was born in Louisiana but raised in Greenville County, where his father was a veterinarian.  In 1986, Verdin graduated with a bachelor's in history from Bob Jones University. In 1987, Verdin married Kimberlee Owens; they have four children. He served as Agriculture and Natural Resources Advisor to Governor Carroll Campbell, 1987–89. Verdin is the owner of Verdin's Farm & Garden Center in Laurens, South Carolina. Verdin is a member of Faith Free Presbyterian Church in Greenville, and he has served as South Carolina Division Commander of the Sons of Confederate Veterans, 1998–2000.

Political career
In 2000, Verdin ran for the District 9 South Carolina Senate seat as a conservative Republican and defeated a 16-year Democratic incumbent, Jim Bryan, in an upset election, winning 54% of the vote. Verdin's election shifted the balance of power in the South Carolina Senate by creating a 23–23 tie between Republicans and Democrats. Anticipating that the Senate rules would be re-written to favor Republicans and that Republican Senate President (and Lieutenant Governor) Bob Peeler would break the tie in the Republicans' favor, long-time Democratic Senator Jefferson Verne Smith (Greenville) switched his party affiliation to Republican in order to retain his powerful committee chairmanship.) This switch resulted in the end of more than a century of Democratic control of the South Carolina Senate.

Verdin serves as the Chairman of the Senate Medical Affairs Committee.

In 2004, Verdin was challenged by former Senator Jim Bryan winning 60% of the vote. He was unopposed for reelection in 2008.

In 2006, the South Carolina Farm Bureau named Verdin Legislator of the Year; and in 2007, Verdin was named Legislator of the Year by the South Carolina Veterinarians Association. In 2004, Verdin was rated A+ by the NRA Political Victory Fund. In announcing Verdin's selection as majority whip in 2008, Majority Leader Harvey Peeler said that in the current political environment, the Republican caucus needed "to return to core conservative values".

Following the Charleston church shooting of 2015, Verdin said he would not vote to remove the Confederate battle flag from the grounds of the state house.

References

External links

1964 births
Living people
Bob Jones University alumni
Republican Party South Carolina state senators
Politicians from Greenville, South Carolina
21st-century American politicians